
Charles Hughes may refer to:

Politics
 Charles Hughes (representative) (1822–1887), U.S. Representative from New York
 Charles J. Hughes Jr. (1853–1911), U.S. Senator from Colorado
 Charles Evans Hughes (1862–1948), Chief Justice of the U.S. Supreme Court, Secretary of State, governor of New York 
 Charles Evans Hughes Jr. (1889–1950), U.S. Solicitor General

Sports
 Charles James Hughes (footballer) (1853–1916), English footballer, referee, and co-founder of Northwich Victoria Football Club
 Charlie Hughes (baseball) (1906-1981), American baseball player
 Charles Hughes (football manager) (born 1929), English football coach and author
 Charlie Hughes (footballer, born 1939), English football goalkeeper
 Chuck Hughes (1943–1971), American football player
 Charlie Hughes (footballer, born 2003), English football centre-back for Wigan

Other
 Charles Hughes (actor), actor who played Young Peter Pettigrew in Harry Potter and the Order of the Phoenix
 Charles Evans Hughes III (1915–1985), U.S. architect
 Charles Frederick Hughes (1866–1934), U.S. Navy admiral
 Charles Hughes (Royal Navy officer), British Royal Navy officer
 Charles A. Hughes, Detroit businessman and ice hockey executive
 Charlie Hughes (audio engineer) (born 1965), American audio engineer and inventor
 Chuck Hughes (chef) (born 1976), French-Canadian chef, television personality, and restaurateur

See also
 Charles James Hughes (disambiguation)